The March for America was a protest march in Washington, DC, United States. On March 21, 2010, over 200,000 marched by the Capitol in Washington, DC, to call for comprehensive immigration reform in that year. The event was organized by Reform Immigration FOR America and many more groups.

Participants largely wore white and waved the United States flag.

President Barack Obama delivered a video message to the assembled crowd, pledging to be their partner in seeking comprehensive immigration reform and fix the country's broken immigration system.

See also 
 List of protest marches on Washington, DC

References

Further reading 
 Broad coalition packs Mall to urge overhaul of immigration laws The Washington Post, March 22, 2010

External links

 Official march web page
 Photos of March 21, 2010 March for America
 March for America Flickr
2010 protests
March 2010 events in the United States
Protest marches in Washington, D.C.
Immigration to the United States
111th United States Congress
2010 in Washington, D.C.